is Hiroshi Teshigahara's film about the 16th century master of the Japanese tea ceremony, Sen no Rikyū. The film was adapted from the novel of Yaeko Nogami.

Synopsis 
The film focuses on the late stages of life of Rikyū, during the highly turbulent Sengoku period of feudal Japan. It starts near the end of Oda Nobunaga's reign, with Rikyū serving as tea master to Nobunaga, and continues into the Momoyama Period. Rikyū is portrayed as a man thoroughly dedicated to aesthetics and perfection, especially in relation to the art of tea. While serving as tea master to the new ruler Toyotomi Hideyoshi, Rikyū finds himself in a uniquely privileged position, with constant access to the powerful feudal lord and the theoretical ability to influence policy, yet he studiously avoids deep involvement in politics while attempting to focus his full attention to the study and teachings of the way of tea. To the extent that he expresses himself, he does so diplomatically, in a way to avoid disrupting the harmony of his relationship with Hideyoshi. Yet, as society is changed violently and radically around him, also finding himself the focus of jealousy and misdirected suspicions, Rikyū ultimately can not avoid confronting larger social issues. He is compelled to express an opinion on Hideyoshi's military plans. This one breach of his studied isolation from world affairs leads quickly to tragic consequences. The closing scene shows Rikyū, entering a bamboo forest at night alone amid an electrical storm. Subtitles inform the viewer that he committed ritual Seppuku in 1592, presumably on this night.

Background 
Director Teshigahara, himself a master and teacher of the Japanese traditional art of ikebana, brings the viewer into appreciation and deep sympathy for Rikyu's aesthetic idealism and his careful diplomatic efforts to avoid excessive entanglement in political affairs. The film itself is very studied in its aestheticism, and very expressive of the shocking force of life intruding into the guarded hermetic space of the artist/idealist.

Cast
Rentarō Mikuni as Sen no Rikyū
Tsutomu Yamazaki as Toyotomi Hideyoshi
Yoshiko Mita as Riki
Matsumoto Kōshirō IX as Oda Nobunaga
Nakamura Kichiemon II as Tokugawa Ieyasu
Ryō Tamura as Toyotomi Hidenaga
Kyōko Kishida as Nene
Tanie Kitabayashi as Ōmandokoro
Sayoko Yamaguchi as Cha-cha
Bandō Mitsugorō X as Ishida Mitsunari
Junkichi Orimoto as Imai Sōkyū
Hisashi Igawa as Yamanoue Sōji
Donald Richie as Gaspar Coelho
Kyoko Enami as Chika

Other Credits
 Yoshinobu Nishioka - Art director
 Keiji Mitsutomo - Assistant director

Awards
Rentarō Mikuni won the Best Actor Award of the Japanese Academy for his roles in this film and Tsuribaka Nisshi of the same year. He also won four other Japanese acting awards for the role. Tōru Takemitsu won the Japanese Academy award for best musical score. Director Hiroshi Teshigahara won awards from the Berlin International Film Festival, and the Montréal World Film Festival. The film was selected as the Japanese entry for the Best Foreign Language Film at the 62nd Academy Awards, but was not accepted as a nominee.

See also
 List of submissions to the 62nd Academy Awards for Best Foreign Language Film
 List of Japanese submissions for the Academy Award for Best Foreign Language Film

References

External links
 
 
 Rikyu at Strictly Film School
 Rikyu at the Japanese Movie Database 
 

1989 films
1989 drama films
1980s biographical films
Japanese biographical films
Jidaigeki films
1980s Japanese-language films
Films directed by Hiroshi Teshigahara
Films based on Japanese novels
Films set in Kyoto
Films set in the 16th century
Films scored by Toru Takemitsu
Cultural depictions of Toyotomi Hideyoshi
Cultural depictions of Oda Nobunaga
Cultural depictions of Tokugawa Ieyasu
1980s Japanese films